Digitonal is a British electronica duo composed of clarinettist and composer Andy Dobson and violinist Samy Bishai, who formed the band in London in the late 1990s.

Reviewing their 2010 retrospective album Be Still My Bleeping Heart, BBC's Mike Diver agrees with the band's description of their own style as "neo classical ambient electronica", adding that, although at times predictable, their music is "extremely accessible, and incredibly pretty", "designed primarily to calm, despite occasionally boisterous beat-work." The Skinny described the duo's sound as akin to Philip Glass and The Orb.

Ben Weisz from musicOMH summarises Digitonal's work by saying that "while the rest of the world spent the noughties lurching from one musical fad to the next, Digitonal quietly created some of the most beautifully-constructed art of the decade. Alex Macpherson, from The Guardian, describes their music as "suited to accompanying a book, a dinner or a hangover [...] Very much atmosphere over action, but not necessarily a bad thing."

Interviews 

In 2016 Andrew Dobson was interviewed by the Data.Wave webzine.

Discography 
 23 Things Fall Apart (2002) 
 The Centre Cannot Hold EP (2004)
 Live At The Oxygen Bar (2005)
 Save Your Light For Darker Days (2008)
 Be Still My Bleeping Heart (2010)
 Beautiful Broken (2015)
 Set The Weather Fair (2020)

References 

Electronica music groups
British electronic music groups